Lycée Galilée may refer to:
Lycée Galilée - Cergy - In the Paris metropolitan area
 
Lycée Galilée with a bilingual French-German section - Combs-la-Ville - In the Paris metropolitan area
Lycée Galilée - Franqueville-Saint-Pierre
Lycée Galilée - Gennevilliers - In the Paris metropolitan area
Lycée Galilée - Guérande
Lycée Galilée - Vienne